Bugaj Radoszewicki  is a village in the administrative district of Gmina Siemkowice, within Pajęczno County, Łódź Voivodeship, in central Poland. The village has a population of 70.

References

Bugaj Radoszewicki